London City Airport is a light metro station on the Docklands Light Railway (DLR) Stratford-Woolwich and Bank-Woolwich Lines; serving London City Airport in East London. It opened on 2 December 2005. It was first located on what was initially King George V branch, and was, until the extension to Woolwich Arsenal was completed, the reason for this branch. It continues to be an important station on the DLR. Trains run westbound to Bank in the City of London, northbound to Stratford International and eastbound to Woolwich Arsenal. The station is in the London Borough of Newham and is located in Travelcard Zone 3.

History
Prior to December 2005, Docklands Light Railway trains would arrive at Canning Town and would only be able to continue in a southeasterly direction towards Royal Victoria. In December 2005, however, the new King George V branch was opened.

Before the station was built the land was home to Drew Primary School; the school was over 100 years old and consisted of three floors with classrooms also on the roof. The new Drew Primary can be found just down the road.

Design
The station (like many Docklands Light Railway stations) is elevated. It is also fully enclosed. There are two entrances to the station and the platforms are connected by escalators and lifts to an intermediate level with a direct link into the airport concourse. Main access to the station for local passengers and mobility impaired customers is by a lower level subway.

It has a direct covered connection with the adjacent airport terminal building. Although the station maintains the DLR philosophy of design, it makes concessions to cater for airport passengers, including a fully enclosed waiting room on the central island platform and, unusually for the DLR, a staffed ticket office. There is a crossover west of the station which allows trains from Poplar and Woolwich Arsenal to reverse here during periods of disruption.

Location
The station is situated to the west side of London City Airport in Silvertown.

Services
Trains run westbound about every 10 minutes to Bank in the City of London and every 10 minutes to Stratford International, adjacent to the Olympic Park. Journey time is 7 minutes to Canning Town to interchange with the Beckton branch of the DLR and with the Jubilee line; 12 minutes to Poplar to interchange with the Stratford and Lewisham branches of the DLR; and 22 minutes to Bank in the City of London.

Trains run eastbound every 10 minutes to Woolwich Arsenal. The journey time is 6 minutes to the terminus.

In peak hours, the frequency increases to one train every eight minutes on both the Bank–Woolwich Arsenal and Stratford–Woolwich Arsenal lines, providing a service every four minutes between Canning Town and Woolwich Arsenal.

Connections
London Buses routes 473 and 474 serve the station.

References

External links

 Transport for London website – London City Airport DLR station page

Airport railway stations in the United Kingdom
Docklands Light Railway stations in the London Borough of Newham
Railway stations in Great Britain opened in 2005
Silvertown